"Do You" is a song by German pop group Bro'Sis. It was written by Toni Cottura, Patricia Bernetti, Arkadius Raschka, and Ingo Hugenroth and produced by the former for their debut studio album Never Forget (Where You Come From) (2002). The uptempo song was released as the album's second single on 25 February 2002 and became a top five hit in Austria and Germany.

Formats and track listings

Credits and personnel

 Ross Antony – vocals
 Hila Bronstein – vocals
 Toni Cottura – production
 Shaham Joyce – vocals

 Faiz Mangat – vocals
 Andi Regler – mixing
 Indira Weis – vocals
 Giovanni Zarrella – vocals

Charts

Weekly charts

Year-end charts

References

2002 songs
Bro'Sis songs
Polydor Records singles
Songs written by Toni Cottura